The  is a Buddhist temple located in the city of Ichikawa, Chiba, Japan, belonging to the Shingon-shu Buzan-ha sect. The present temple is of uncertain foundation, but claims to be the direct descendant of the original Nara period provincial temple ("kokubunji") of former Shimōsa Province. which fell into ruins sometime in the Kamakura period. The Nara-period temple ruins were designated a National Historic Site in 1967, and the area under protection includes the site of a kiln used to produce roof tiles used by the temple. The area designated was expanded in 2002

Ancient Shimōsa Kokubun-ji

The Shimōsa Kokubun-ji was located at the southwestern end of the Shimōsa Plateau at an elevation of 20 meters on the coast of Tokyo Bay and northwest of the city center of modern Ichikawa. The foundations of the Nara-period pagoda, the Kondō, and Lecture Hall were discovered in an archaeological excavation conducted from 1965 to 1966 by the Ichikawa City Board of Education The Kondō was found to have dimensions of 31.5 meters east-to-west x 19 meters north-to-south and is located under the current Main Hall of the modern temple. The Lecture Hall was 26 meters east-to-west by 18 meters north-to-south, and is under the current cemetery. The pagoda foundation was 18 meters square. The arrangement of the buildings was similar to that of Hōryū-ji in Nara, which is rare for a  kokubunji temple, whose typical template was the great national temple of Tōdai-ji in Nara. In a further excavation from 1989 to 1994, the extent of the temple compound was confirmed to be 300 meters east-to-west by 350 meters north-to-south. A large variety of artifacts such as earthenware, metalware, ceramics and roof tiles have been discovered. In the near vicinity was the ruins of a noborigama-style kiln used to make the roof tiles used by the temple. The pattern of the eaves tiles was not the lotus pattern that was standard for temples at this time, but was based on the hōsōge flower design (an imaginary peony-like floral pattern), which further points to the unusual nature of this temple.

Temple legend states without any documentary evidence that it was founded by the wandering holy ascetic Gyōki, and as was often the case, later legends changed this attribution to Kūkai. The temple is mentioned in the mid-Kamakura period in various documents and records, but due to repeated disasters (fires in 1336 1479 and 1717 have been recorded), most of the temple records have been lost. It appears possible that portions of the original temple survived until at least the Meiji period. A large fire in 1891 destroyed almost all of the temple. The present main hall is a modern design by the noted architect Hideto Kishida in 1942, and is located precisely above the site of the ancient Kondō. The temple is a five-minute walk from the Kokubu bus stop on the Keisei bus from JR East Sobu Line Ichikawa Station.

Ancient Shimōsa Kokubun-niji
The temple occupied an irregular layout surrounded by a moat, with an east–west dimension of 303 meters, and a north-to-south dimension of 340 meters. The layout of the temple was almost identical to that of the Shimōsa Kokubun-ji, but on a smaller scale and lacking in a pagoda. An excavation was carried out in 1932, during which the foundations of the Kondō, Lecture Hall, Middle Gate, South Gate. Fragments of roof tiles with the word "nunnery" was discovered, and unlike the Shimōsa Kokubun-ji, both lotus-style and  hōsōge-style eave tiles have been found. The Kondō had dimensions of 25.5 meters by 22.4 meters. The compound was surrounded by a moat, of which the north, east and south sides have been confirmed. The ruins were a designated historic site in 1967.

See also
Provincial temple
List of Historic Sites of Japan (Chiba)

References

External links

Shimōsa Kokubun-ji per Ibaraki Prefectural home page 
Shimōsa Kokubun-niji per Ibaraki Prefectural home page 
Shimōsa Kokubun-ji per Ichikawa City home page 
Shimōsa Kokubun-niji per Ichikawa City home page 

Buddhist temples in Chiba Prefecture
Nara period
Ichikawa, Chiba
History of Chiba Prefecture
Historic Sites of Japan
Shimōsa Province
8th-century establishments in Japan
8th-century Buddhist temples
Buddhist archaeological sites in Japan